Driffield Castle is located in the town of Driffield, approximately  north of Beverley, East Riding of Yorkshire, England.

It was a Norman earthwork motte and bailey fortress which was founded by Hugh d'Avranches, 1st Earl of Chester. It was re-fortified in the 13th century.  The motte was damaged by 19th century quarrying and houses have encroached on the bailey.

The site listing in Historic England notes that excavations in the 19th century and in 1975 revealed the remains of a Roman occupation dating to the fourth century AD, underlying the motte. Driffield 19th century archaeologist John Robert Mortimer noted fragments of medieval swords, spears and silver coins. A reference to Driffield in the Anglo-Saxon Chronicle suggests that this is also the site of a rare eighth century Northumbrian palace, and the site is known to have been part of the royal demesne from the 11th to 15th centuries AD.

The castle and surrounding 2.33-acre site was sold at auction in 2011. 

Only earthworks now remain and the site is known as Moot Hill.

References

Castles in the East Riding of Yorkshire
Driffield